Bob Parker may refer to:

 Bob Parker (footballer) (born 1935), English professional footballer
 Bob Parker (mayor) (born 1953), New Zealand television host and mayor
 Bob Parker (rower) (born 1934), New Zealand rower
 Bob Parker (accounting scholar) (1932–2016), British accounting scholar

See also
 Bobby Parker (disambiguation)
 Rob Parker (disambiguation)
 Robert Parker (disambiguation)